John Wylie may refer to:
John Wylie (actor) (died 2004/1925–2004), American actor
John Wylie (businessman) (born 1961), Australian investment banker
John Wylie (footballer, born 1854) (1854–1924), English amateur footballer
John Wylie (footballer, born 1936) (1936–2013), English footballer
John Wylie (musician) (born 1974), hardcore musician from Florida
John Wyllie (politician) (1835–1870), British member of parliament for Hereford
John Wylie (surgeon) (1790–1852), Scottish military surgeon
John Wylie, character on British soap opera Emmerdale

See also
John Wiley (disambiguation)
John Wyllie (disambiguation)
John Wyly (died 1400), member of the Parliament of England for Marlborough